The Kennebec-class oilers were sixteen United States Navy medium oilers built during World War II to three related designs at Bethlehem Sparrows Point Shipyard of Sparrows Point, Maryland and Sun Shipbuilding & Drydock Co. of Chester, Pennsylvania, all of which survived the war. One is still in commercial service as of 2022.

All of the ships of the class initially were to be built for private companies, but the outset of World War II, the ships were transferred to the United States Maritime Commission and given new names. Later, when allocated to the U.S. Navy, they were renamed again.

In some cases the Kennebec class is divided into three classes, the Kennebec class (AO-36 to AO-40, AO-48), the Mattaponi class (AO-41 to AO-44, AO-47) and the  class (AO-68 to 72).

History
One of the first acts of the War Shipping Administration (WSA), established in February 1942, was to address the Navy's pressing need for oilers by requisitioning five tankers in service or under construction for civilian companies.  Three of these were  Type T2 "national defense tankers" designed by the Maritime Commission with potential militarization in mind and built by Bethlehem Steel for Socony-Vacuum Oil Co: the Corsicana, Caddo and Calusa. A month later the WSA requisitioned six more:  Socony's Colina and Conastoga, together with four similar ships building at Sun Shipbuilding and Drydock for Keystone Tankships to an enlarged design, later called T2-A: Kalkay, Ellkay, Jorkay and Emkay.  Corsicana was commissioned as USS Kennebec, becoming the lead ship of the class; Kalkay was renamed Mattaponi and gave that name to the T2-A subclass. In June the WSA moved to acquire the remaining member of each group, Aekay and Catawba.

The T2 design had itself been based on two ships built by Bethlehem Steel in 1938–39, Mobilfuel and Mobilube; the T2's principal difference was MarCom's inclusion of more powerful engines to produce the Navy's desired 16.5 knots. In the meantime MarCom under the State of Emergency had ordered thirteen duplicates of Mobilfuel for the merchant marine; the first of these were nearing completion in late 1942 when the Navy, still very short of oilers, requisitioned the first five starting with Samoset (ex-Mobiloil), renamed USS Chiwawa. Other than being limited to 15 knots, the Chiwawas were effectively identical to the Kennebecs, despite being assigned the confusing design code T3-S-A1.

All sixteen ships survived the war, but were decommissioned shortly afterwards in favor of the larger, faster . Kennebec, Merrimack, Kankakee, Mattaponi, Monongahela, Tappahannock, and Neches were recommissioned for the U.S. Navy after World War II. Mattaponi and Tappahanock were reactivated four times, serving until 1970.

Chiwawa (now Lee A. Tregurtha) is still in commercial service on the Great Lakes. Neshanic (now American Victory) was sold for scrap and towed away to Turkey in 2018.

Ships of the class

Citations

References

Auxiliary replenishment ship classes
Auxiliary ship classes of the United States Navy
 
Ships built in Sparrows Point, Maryland